Boris Wastiau (born 1970) has been Director of the Musée d'ethnographie de Genève since February 2009. He is also a Tenured professor at the University of Geneva.

Born in Belgium, he was educated at the Université libre de Bruxelles, University of Coimbra and the University of East Anglia (MA, 1993; PhD, 1997).

References

1970 births
Living people
Université libre de Bruxelles alumni
Alumni of the University of East Anglia
Academic staff of the University of Geneva
Place of birth missing (living people)
Date of birth missing (living people)
University of Coimbra alumni